This is chronology of films produced in the Netherlands. The films are produced in the Dutch language.

Lists by decade
 List of Dutch films before 1910
 List of Dutch films of the 1910s
 List of Dutch films of the 1920s
 List of Dutch films of the 1930s
 List of Dutch films of the 1940s
 List of Dutch films of the 1950s
 List of Dutch films of the 1960s
 List of Dutch films of the 1970s
 List of Dutch films of the 1980s
 List of Dutch films of the 1990s
 List of Dutch films of the 2000s
 List of Dutch films of the 2010s
 List of Dutch films of the 2020s

See also
List of years in the Netherlands
List of years in Dutch television

External links
 Dutch film at the Internet Movie Database